Disney's Aladdin: A Musical Spectacular was a Broadway-style show based on Disney's 1992 animated film Aladdin with music by Alan Menken and lyrics by Howard Ashman and Tim Rice.

It was performed inside the Hyperion Theater in Hollywood Land at Disney California Adventure from 2003 to 2016. In September 2015, it was announced that the show's final day of performance would be January 10, 2016. The show was then closed on January 11, and was replaced by a musical stage show Frozen – Live at the Hyperion, inspired by Disney's 2013 animated film Frozen, which premiered in May 2016.

A version of the show continues to play on board the Disney Cruise Line ships Disney Fantasy and Disney Wish.

Cast
 Miles Wesley - Aladdin
 Deedee Magno Hall, Cassandra Marie Murphy - Jasmine
 Nick Santa Maria - Genie
 Megan Sheahan - Carpet
 Jance Roberts - Jafar
 Jamila Ajibade - Narrator

History
The production is a Broadway-type show. Many of the scenes and songs from the movie are re-created on stage and some of the action spills out into the aisles, such as Prince Ali's arrival in Agrabah on elephant back.

At Disney California Adventure, the 45-minute production took place in the 2,000 seat Hyperion Theater, located at the end of Hollywood Land. While most of the show was scripted, the Genie's dialogue often changed to reflect current events in the news and popular culture. The musical replaced the venue's previous show, The Power of Blast, which played from 2001 to 2002.

Soundtrack

Buena Vista Records released an official soundtrack to the production in 2003. This is an original cast recording, and includes almost every piece of music used in the show. The main cast on the recording is Miles Wesley (Aladdin), Deedee Magno (Jasmine), Nick Santa Maria (Genie), Lance Roberts (Jafar) and Jamila Ajibade (Narrator). Orchestrations by Timothy Williams.

Track Listing
1. Arabian Nights*/A Thousand Stories/Who Dares Approach (1:43)
2. Off You Go/The Mouth Closes (:34)
3. You Have Been Warned (:11)
4. Aladdin Intro (:24)
5. One Jump Ahead (2:44)
6. Street Rat! (:24)
7. Princess of Agrabah (:14)
8. Old Man (:48)
9. Go Now, Into the Cave/Gold Reveal/Cave Collapse (1:57)
10. Carpet (:39)
11. Genie Up (:22)
12. Friend Like Me (3:18)
13. The Palace (:25)
14. Sultan's Fanfare (:13)
15. Prince Ali (2:04)
16. Genie Free/Jafar Plots (1:27)
17. To Be Free (2:44)
18. A Whole New World (3:38)
19. A Whole New World - Underscore (:20)
20. I'll Say (:42)
21. We Through Yet/Prince Ali (Reprise) (1:36)
22. Snake! (:41)
23. He Has More Power (:50)
24. Father, I've Decided (:59)
25. Celebration (1:36) 
26. Curtain Call (1:13)

See also
 Beauty and the Beast Live on Stage

References

Aladdin (franchise) in amusement parks
Walt Disney Parks and Resorts entertainment
Disney California Adventure
Disney Cruise Line
Hollywood Land
2003 musicals
Musicals based on animated films
2003 establishments in California
2016 disestablishments in California